George W. Lawler, (November 27, 1851March 21, 1913) was a 19th-century American Boston Maritime pilot. He is best known for being with the Boston pilot service for over 40 years. He was captain of the famous pilot boats Lillie, and Hesper.

Early life

Captain George W. Lawler was born in Bremen, Maine on November 27, 1851. He was the son of William Lawler and Matilda Richards. He married Lillian M. Sheriffs on June 25, 1873, in Boston, Massachusetts. They had three children. At the age of 11, he sailed around the world in the ship Ocean Belle, which gave him an appreciation of the sea.

Career

Lawler was with the Boston pilot service for over 40 years. Lawler started in the pilot service through his brother-in-law, Charles A. Hayden, who was a piloting agent of Boston. When Lawler was 15, he received his commission as a branch pilot. The Massachusetts Humane Society awarded him silver and bronze medals. The silver medal was given in recognition of his bravery in saving the lives of the crew of the schooner William D. Cargill, which was wrecked in a heavy storm in early 1884. The bronze medal was given to him for the rescue of four of the crew from the schooner Hattie L. Curtis in September 1888.

On March 13, 1895, Lawler was blamed for stranding the steamer SS Venetian while navigating through a narrow Boston channel. His commission as a branch pilot was revoked by the pilot commission, he was put on probation, and he could only serve on a warrant commission.

Lillie

 
He was captain of the pilot boat Lillie, designed by Dennison J. Lawlor, which was built for him and other Boston pilots in 1876. He named the Lillie, after his wife, Lillie M. Lawler. The Lillie, was one of the most graceful and attractive of the Boston pilot-boats. She represented a trend toward deep-bodied boats.

In Lawler's ship log, he wrote about the Lillie, and how she made it through the Boston Bay gale of 1879, when snow and ice made boats immovable. Lawler developed a treatment of using a woolen cloth and kerosene to fight the cold.

Hesper

The Boston pilot boat Hesper, designed by Dennison J. Lawlor, was built for Lawler in 1884. She was known to be the largest pilot boat under the American flag at 104 feet long and the fastest of the Boston fleet.

In September 1885, in the fifth America's Cup, Lawler sailed the Hesper, flying a balloon-jib topsail, to New York to watch the race between the Puritan and the British challenger, Genesta. The Hesper, competed in several first-class sailing races, and in 1886, she won the silver cup in what was known as the first Fishermen's Race.

Death

Lawler died on March 21, 1913, at the age of 62, in Winthrop, Massachusetts. Funeral services was at his home in Winthrop. Reverend R. Perry Bush of the Grand Lodge officiated. He was buried on March 24, at the Woodlawn Cemetery in Everett, Massachusetts.

See also

 List of Northeastern U. S. Pilot Boats

References

People from Boston
1851 births
1913 deaths
Maritime pilotage
Sea captains